Porto Koufo is the largest natural harbour in Greece (in depth). The harbour was mentioned by the historian Thucydides. German submarines used it during World War II because of its geographical location and direct access to the Aegean Sea. 

Porto Koufo is located in the municipality Sithonia, Chalkidiki.

External links

Populated places in Chalkidiki